is a Japanese original net animation (ONA) series produced by Japanese studio Typhoon Graphics. This anime is based on Egyptian mythology and the original character design drawn by yuka. Because of the cute character designs, yuka's illustrations became popular on SNS in Japan. yuka also wrote a picture book about this and it was published by Frontier Works. The first season started airing on December 7, 2020, up to February 8, 2021. The second season premiered January 11, 2023 on Tokyo MX.

Cast 

 Anubis
 
 Thoth
 
 Bastet
 
 Medjed
 
 Horus
 
 Apep
 
 Khnum
 
 Ra
 
 Sa-ta
 
 Set
 
 Sobek
 
 Wenet
 
 Otter
 narrator

Media

Book

Anime 
This anime series is produced by Typhoon Graphics and Frontier Works, originally created by yuka. Directed by Katsuya Kikuchi, series composition by Yuuichirou Higashide, character design and chief animation direction by Suzuna Okuyama, music by Keiji Inai. Crunchyroll licensed the series outside of Asia. On August 1, 2021, it was announced that the anime will receive a second season. Junichi Suwabe was cast in October 2022 as the voice actor for Sobek, the Egyptian god associated with the Nile crocodile. The second season started on Tokyo MX and DMM TV at 1 a.m. January 11, 2023. Other networks and websites will launch on January 15.

Notes

References

External links 

 Official website 
 Official Twitter 
 

2020 anime ONAs
Anime based on novels
Crunchyroll anime
Japanese picture books
Typhoon Graphics
Tokyo MX original programming
Egyptian mythology in popular culture
Egyptian mythology in anime and manga